Milush Ivanchev (born 9 August 1954) is a Bulgarian cross-country skier. He competed at the 1984 Winter Olympics and the 1988 Winter Olympics.

References

External links
 

1954 births
Living people
Bulgarian male cross-country skiers
Olympic cross-country skiers of Bulgaria
Cross-country skiers at the 1984 Winter Olympics
Cross-country skiers at the 1988 Winter Olympics
People from Pazardzhik Province